The 1991 World Table Tennis Championships men's doubles was the 41st edition of the men's doubles championship.

Thomas von Scheele and Peter Karlsson won the title after defeating Wang Tao and Lü Lin in the final by three sets to two. The matches were best of five sets from the quarter final stage.

Results

See also
List of World Table Tennis Championships medalists

References

--